opened in Matsumae, Hokkaidō, Japan in 1975. The display documents the area's geology and natural history alongside displays related to the histories of the Ainu and of the Matsumae Domain.

See also

 List of Cultural Properties of Japan - paintings (Hokkaidō)
 List of Cultural Properties of Japan - historical materials (Hokkaidō)
 Matsumae Castle

References

Museums in Hokkaido
Museums established in 1975
1975 establishments in Japan
Matsumae, Hokkaido